For the AC/DC song of the same name, see Highway to Hell.

"Beating Around the Bush" is a pop song written by Wayne Burt and recorded by Australian blues, rock and R&B band Jo Jo Zep & The Falcons. The song was released in July 1976 as the second single from the soundtrack to the 1976 film Oz. It was later included on Jo Jo Zep & The Falcons' debut studio album, Don't Waste It (1977).

The song peaked at number 73 on the Kent Music Report in Australia.

Track listing 
7" (OZ 001) 
Side A – "Beating Around the Bush" - 3:00
Side B – "Glad I'm Living Here" - 4:07

Charts

References 

1976 songs
1976 singles
Jo Jo Zep & The Falcons songs